Sri Acharya Ekkirala Bharadwaj Swamy Varu (30 October 1938 – 12 April 1989), was a Dattatreya incarnation and who authored many Hindu spiritual books, primarily on the life and worship of Shirdi Sai Baba and Sri Dattatreya. He is well known as "Sri Sai Master". He had born in the Bharadwajasa gotra like SriPada Swamy and Sri Shirdi Sai Baba. He is the fourth son of Sri Ekkirala Ananthacharya and Srimathi Buchamma. Sri Ekkirala Bharadwaj written Telugu-language book Sri Sai Leelamrutham is one of the famous book (Parayana Grandam). Sri Ekkirala Bharadwaja later translated the book to English with the name Sai Baba The Master which is also a popular one. He also wrote "Sri Guru Charitra" in English and Telugu.  He also has written  many spiritual books in Telugu and English.

Biography
Sri Acharya Ekkirala Bharadwaja was born at Bapatla, a town in Guntur district of the Indian state of Andhra Pradesh and was a post-graduate in English literature. He completed the Indian Administrative Service and he rejected posting orders(Himachal Pradesh). He got profound spiritual experience on 9th Feb 1963 at the Samadhi Mandir of Sai Baba of Shirdi, thereafter becoming a lecturer of English literature because that gave him an opportunity to spread his master's teachings.

Even as a young child Sri Bharadwaja exhibited tremendous courage both physical and mental. He had an inquisitive attitude, a questioning mind, strong determination, and phenomenal powers of concentration. Young boy (Sri Acharya Ekkira Bharadwaja) took his matriculation exam directly at the age of 12 years at Varanasi. By the time he had attained 19 years, he was a post-graduate in English Literature and started teaching at the Sarma Degree College in Ongole, a town in Andhra Pradesh. Once, with the objective of confirming to himself that he could complete any job that he set for himself, however difficult, Sri Acharya Ekkirala Bharadwaja took up his brother's challenge to clear the UPSC examinations. Unsurprisingly, he got through with a mere 3 months preparation, which for most people takes at least a year of tough preparation. However, he gave up the resulting prestigious and luxurious career as it was against his personal goals.

The origin of Sri Acharya Ekkirala Bharadwaja's theistic outlook of life however had its beginning many years before. Endowed with an inquisitive mind, sharp intellect, keen observation and logical deduction, steadfast determination and a highly developed sense of integrity, truthfulness and wit, his dynamic spirit urged him on the quest for the ultimate truth, the meaning of life and death, which was instigated by the sudden demise of his beloved nephew at the very moment of Sri Bharadwaja's Brahmopadesam during the sacred thread ceremony in 1955. The auspicious occasion had been selected by those who were stalwarts in such divine matters, the Vedic syllables chanted during the ceremony were highly powerful as were the spiritual observances that his brother had undertaken prior to the ceremony and yet, all came to naught! The child's life could not be saved! This brought about a transformation in Sri Bharadwaja like no other. In his own words, "…I became deeply atheistic; moreover, a spirit of quest dawned in me. I thought endlessly and deeply about the nature of life, the highest goal of life, about Atma-Anatma, the nature of birth and death, which lasted very strongly

After Sri Bharadwaja’s stint as a Lecturer at the college of Ongole, he taught for a short while at the Viveka Vardhini evening college in Hyderabad and then moved to Bapatla College. Here too he resigned after a brief period and stayed at the ashram of the Mother of Jillelamudi for a year. Later, he moved to the Vidyanagar College at Vidyanagar.

As a lecturer, Sri Acharya Ekkirala Bharadwaja Swamy Varu would often incorporate life’s values and its guiding principles while explaining the subject which was of far more practical use later in their lives. Almost all his time after college hours was spent in discussing their needs and wants out of life, the spiritual basis of the human life, its correlation to ancient wisdom and modern day science, for which the students gathered in increasing numbers and heard with rapt attention and awe. Several of them were so inspired that they even practiced spiritual discipline under the able guidance of Sri Ekkirala Bharadwaja.
 
"Sri Guru Bharadwaj Thapovanam" (14.031567210959647, 80.0299242449768) was actually the house that Sri Acharya rented while working as an English Lecturer in the N B K R(Nedurumalli Bala Krishna Reddy) Science and Arts Degree College at Vidyanagar, Nellore District in 1970. The holy site which was later named as Thapovanam(తపోవనం). The Vidyanagar(రెండో షిర్డి) is a small village in Kota Mandal in SPSR Nellore (Sri Potti SreeRamulu Nellore) District of Andhra Pradesh State, India. Sri Acharya Bharadwaj Swamy Varu stayed at Thapovan for 15 years. The Thapovanam site also holds great significance for the devotees of Acharya Sri Ekkirala Bharadawaja Swamy Varu not only for the memories contained therein but also for the numerous saints that graced this house by their presence. so it was preserved as a monument. The holy book "Sri SaiLeelamrutham" and "Sri Gurucharitra" that is a "Parayana grandha" for millions today and has also been translated into several languages was finalized in this very little house. Many of his other works were also penned here.

Bharadwaja researched the lives and teachings of several saints, traveling extensively and personally contacting many of them. He insisted on the necessity of a Sadguru to direct devotees in their spiritual path. The culmination of all this is a series of books on Sai Baba and many other saints. He believed Sri Sai Baba (Sri Dattatreya incarnation) to be the matchless saint, a blend of all religions and the answer to all the questions of the present day and spirituality.

Sri Ekkirala Bharadwaja master left his physical body on 12 April 1989 at Ongole. His Sannidanam(Sri Dattatreya Parampara has to be called as Sannidanam) is in Ongole Sai baba temple.

శకలం సర్వం శ్రీ దత్తాత్రేయం |
జై సాయి మాస్టర్ ||

Institutions
Bharadwaja founded the Shirdi Sai Cultural Mission at Vidyanagar and the Sai Baba Mission in Ongole. He also founded a Telugu-language fortnightly publication, Sai Baba, that is now produced monthly and continues to spread his messages. The publication inspired the construction of several Sai Baba temples. His thoughts are now promoted by the Sri Master Universal Sai Trust & Acharya Bharadwaja Peace Foundation in Ongole, Andhra Pradesh.

Works
Bharadwaja authored many books in Telugu and English. 
Some of his notable works are:

English

Telugu
Sri GuruCharitra
Sri Saileelamruthamu
Sri Pakalapati Guruvugari Charitra
Vignana Veechikalu
Sri Sainatha satvana Manjari
Sri Sai Nitya Satya Vratham
Edi Nijam
Sri Swamy Samartha
Sri Sainatha Prabodhamruthamu
Avadhutha Sri Chirala Swamy Charitra
Sri Guru Charitra Samhitayana
Buddha Dhyana Hrudayam
Sri Dattavatara Mahatmyamu
And other spiritual books ( Nenu Darsinchina Mahatmulu)

Legacy
American psychologist Dan Landis and Rosita D. Albert of University of Minnesota credits Ekkirala Bharadwaja for spreading the devotion towards Sai Baba of Shirdi in Andhra Pradesh and says, "Shiridi Sai is worshipped by Hindus and Muslims alike, and the Late E.Bharadwaja's effort to take his message to Andhra Pradesh definitely helped create a large following for Shiridi Sai in his state".

References

Bibliography

External links
http://saibharadwaja.org/

Indian Hindu monks
20th-century Hindu philosophers and theologians
Telugu people
1938 births
Sai Baba of Shirdi
1989 deaths